Asiagomphus is a genus of dragonfly in the family Gomphidae. It contains the following species:

Asiagomphus amamiensis 
Asiagomphus auricolor 
Asiagomphus coreanus 
Asiagomphus corniger 
Asiagomphus cuneatus 
Asiagomphus giza 
Asiagomphus gongshanensis 
Asiagomphus hainanensis 
Asiagomphus hesperius 
 Asiagomphus kosterini 
Asiagomphus melaenops 
Asiagomphus melanopsoides 
Asiagomphus monticola 
Asiagomphus motuoensis 
Asiagomphus nilgiricus 
Asiagomphus odoneli 
Asiagomphus pacatus 
Asiagomphus pacificus 
Asiagomphus perlaetus 
Asiagomphus personatus 
Asiagomphus pryeri 
Asiagomphus septimus 
Asiagomphus somnolens 
Asiagomphus superciliaris 
Asiagomphus xanthenatus 
Asiagomphus yayeyamensis

References

Gomphidae
Anisoptera genera
Taxonomy articles created by Polbot